Grigorijs Panteļejevs (born November 13, 1972 in Gastello, Soviet Union) is a Latvian ice hockey coach and former player.

Career
The 5th choice, 136th overall selection of the Boston Bruins in the 1992 NHL Entry Draft,  Panteļejevs came to North America and the NHL in 1992-93 after spending the past two seasons with Dynamo Riga.

Upon his arrival in North America, diminutive forward went on to split his first season with Boston and their AHL affiliate in Providence before spending the majority of the next two seasons in Providence.

After three seasons in the Bruins organization,  Panteļejevs was released following the 1994-95 season only to be signed as a free agent by the New York Islanders in September 1995.

Panteļejevs played only four games with the Islanders while playing the majority of the 1995-96 season with the IHL's Utah Grizzlies and Las Vegas Thunder. In 1996-97  Panteļejevs joined the IHL's San Antonio Dragons and went on to play a little over one season with the team before being dealt to the Orlando Solar Bears early into the 1997-98 IHL season.

The Gastello, USSR native returned to Orlando the following year before heading overseas in 99-2000 as a member of the Hannover Scorpions of the Bundesliga/Deutsche Eishockey Liga and went on to represent Latvia in the 2000 World Championships. After only one season in Germany,  jumped to the Swiss League then to the Swedish Elite League before landing in Finland in 2002-03. In the midst those three seasons, the diminutive forward went on to represent Latvia two more times at the World Championships, once in 2001 and again in 2003.

Panteļejevs made himself available for the 2004 World Championships held in Prague, Czech Republic and did the same in 2005.

He has played in 9 World championships and 2006 Olympics for Latvian national team.

He is currently the head coach of HK Rostov.

Career statistics

Regular season and playoffs

International

External links
 
 
 
 

1972 births
Living people
Bolzano HC players
Boston Bruins draft picks
Boston Bruins players
Dinamo Riga players
EHC Olten players
EK Zell am See players
EV Landsberg players
EV Zug players
Expatriate ice hockey players in Russia
Hannover Scorpions players
HC Martigny players
HK Riga 2000 players
Ice hockey players at the 2002 Winter Olympics
Ice hockey players at the 2006 Winter Olympics
IFK Arboga IK players
Las Vegas Thunder players
Latvian ice hockey left wingers
Lokomotiv Yaroslavl players
New York Islanders players
Olympic ice hockey players of Latvia
Orlando Solar Bears (IHL) players
Lahti Pelicans players
Providence Bruins players
San Antonio Dragons players
SG Pontebba players
Södertälje SK players
Soviet ice hockey players
Utah Grizzlies (IHL) players